David Kim may refer to:

 David Kim (violinist) (born 1963), American violinist
 David Kim (restaurateur), American businessman and CEO of Mexican fast food chain Baja Fresh
 David J. Kim (born 1979), CEO and founder of C2 Education Centers
 David S. Kim (born 1965), the California Secretary of Transportation
 David Kwangshin Kim (born 1935), Korean Protestant Christian pastor